Zaghouan (or Zaghwan;) is a town in the northern half of Tunisia.
 
Situated on a low ridge of the Dorsale Mountains, the town has a mild climate and presents a green aspect. Cold water from here was taken by the Zaghouan Aqueduct to Carthage. The town is famous for its roses, originally cultivated by Muslim refugees from Spain in the seventeenth century. The town is located around 60 km due south of Tunis and around 50 km inland (west) from the Gulf of Hammamet and has an estimated population of around 20,837 (2014). It is the capital of the Zaghouan Governorate.

On the mountain south of the city is the Roman Water Temple Djebel Zaghouan (Temple de Eaux), source of an aqueduct which used to take water to the city of Carthage over 100 km away. The ruins here are illustrated in Fisher's Drawing Room Scrap Book, 1840, as 'Temple and Fountain of Zagwhan', the painting being by Sir Greenville Temple with a poetical illustration by Letitia Elizabeth Landon.

Ecclesiastical history 

Zagwan is the presumed site of the Ancient city of Zica, which was among the many of sufficient importance in the Roman province of Africa Proconsularis to become a suffragan diocese of the Metropolitan of Carthage, in the papal sway, yet was to fade completely, probably at the seventh century advent of Islam.

Its historically documented bishops were :
 Donatist schismatic Donatus attended the Council of Carthage in 411, where his heresy was condemned as such by the Catholic bishops, among whom Zica had no counterpart
 Vincentius intervened at the Council of Carthage in 484 called by king Huneric of the Vandal Kingdom, and was afterwards exiled like most Catholic bishops.

Climate

 Gallery 

 See also 
 List of Catholic dioceses in Tunisia

 Notes 

 References 

 Sources and external links 
 GCatholic - (former &) titular see of Zica
 Bibliography - Zica bishopric
 J. Mesnage, L'Afrique chrétienne'', Paris 1912, pp. 237–238

Populated places in Zaghouan Governorate
Communes of Tunisia
Catholic titular sees in Africa